The Barstovian North American Stage on the geologic timescale is the North American  faunal stage according to the North American Land Mammal Ages chronology (NALMA), typically set from 16,300,000 to 13,600,000 years BP, a period of . It is usually considered to overlap the Langhian and Serravallian stages of the Middle Miocene. The Barstovian is preceded by the Hemingfordian and followed by the Clarendonian NALMA stages.

The Barstovian can be further divided into the substages of:
 late Late Barstovian: Lower boundary source of the base of the Langhian (approximate)
 early Late Barstovian: Base of the Langhian (approximate)
 early/lower Barstovian: Upper boundary source: base of Clarendonian (approximate)

Correlations 
The Barstovian (15.97 to 13.6 Ma) correlates with:
 SALMA
 Colloncuran (15.5-13.8 Ma)
 earliest Laventan (13.8-11.8 Ma)
 ELMA - Astaracian (15.97-11.608 Ma)
 Mammal Neogene Units, European Faunal Zones
 MN 5 zone (15.97-13.65 Ma)
 CPS
 earliest Badenian (13.65-12.7 Ma)
 New Zealand stratigraphy - Southland epoch (15.9-10.92 Ma)
 Clifdenian (15.9-13.65 Ma)
 earliest Lillburnian (13.65-12.7 Ma)
 NMAC
 Shanwangian (16.9-13.65 Ma)
 earliest Tunggurian (13.65-11.1 Ma)

References 

 
Miocene life
Miocene geochronology
Miocene animals of North America
Miocene California